Charlie George Caton (born 25 November 2002) is a Welsh footballer who plays as a forward for Chester FC on loan from Shrewsbury Town.

He is the son of longstanding Bala Town manager Colin Caton.

He is an Everton supporter and his favourite player is Matthew Pennington.

Career statistics

Club

References

2002 births
Living people
Welsh footballers
Association football forwards
Shrewsbury Town F.C. players

https://www.shrewsburytown.com/news/2022/november/charlie-caton-joins-chester-fc-on-one-month-loan/